The Wrestling competition in the 1977 Summer Universiade were held in Sofia, Bulgaria. It was added as an optional sports by the host country, Bulgaria.

Freestyle Wrestling

Greco-Roman Wrestling

Medal table

References 

 Medalists: https://www.fisu.net/sport-events/fisu-world-university-games/summer-fisu-world-university-games (FISU World University Games 1959-2019 Overview)
 Freestyle results
 https://web.archive.org/web/20100124113523/http://sports123.com/wre/mun-f48.html
 https://web.archive.org/web/20100124113528/http://sports123.com/wre/mun-f52.html
 https://web.archive.org/web/20100124113539/http://sports123.com/wre/mun-f57.html
 https://web.archive.org/web/20100124112204/http://sports123.com/wre/mun-f62.html
 https://web.archive.org/web/20100124112209/http://sports123.com/wre/mun-f68.html
 https://web.archive.org/web/20100124112222/http://sports123.com/wre/mun-f74a.html
 https://web.archive.org/web/20100124112227/http://sports123.com/wre/mun-f82.html
 https://web.archive.org/web/20100124112237/http://sports123.com/wre/mun-f90.html
 https://web.archive.org/web/20100124112154/http://sports123.com/wre/mun-f100.html
 https://web.archive.org/web/20100124113554/http://sports123.com/wre/mun-fo100.html
 Greco-Roman results
 https://web.archive.org/web/20100124112247/http://sports123.com/wre/mun-g48.html
 https://web.archive.org/web/20100124112252/http://sports123.com/wre/mun-g52.html
 https://web.archive.org/web/20100124112304/http://sports123.com/wre/mun-g57.html
 https://web.archive.org/web/20100124113610/http://sports123.com/wre/mun-g62.html
 https://web.archive.org/web/20100124113615/http://sports123.com/wre/mun-g68.html
 https://web.archive.org/web/20100124112319/http://sports123.com/wre/mun-g74a.html
 https://web.archive.org/web/20100124113620/http://sports123.com/wre/mun-g82.html
 https://web.archive.org/web/20100124112329/http://sports123.com/wre/mun-g90.html
 https://web.archive.org/web/20100124113600/http://sports123.com/wre/mun-g100.html
 https://web.archive.org/web/20100124113630/http://sports123.com/wre/mun-go100.html

1977 Summer Universiade
1981
Universiade